Paul Barnard is an American politician who served as a Republican member of the Wyoming Senate, representing the 15th district from 2011 until 2019. The 15th District encompasses Uinta County. Barnard was succeeded in office by Wendy Davis Schuler.

References

Living people
Republican Party Wyoming state senators
Pacific University alumni
People from Evanston, Wyoming
21st-century American politicians
Year of birth missing (living people)